A Umbra Omega is the fifth full-length album by Norwegian black metal band Dødheimsgard, also known as DHG. It was released on March 16, 2015, by Peaceville Records.

Track listing

Personnel

DHG
 Vicotnik (Yusaf Parvez) – music, arrangements, words (on tracks 2, 3, 5) 
 Aldrahn - words (on tracks 4, 6)
 Sekaran aka Terghl - drums

Additional personnel
 Olivier Côté - words (on track 6)
 Lars Emil Måløy - bass (on tracks 5, 6)

References

2015 albums
Dødheimsgard albums